The 12th Cavalry Division (12-ya Kavaleriiskaya Diviziya) was a cavalry formation of the Russian Imperial Army.

Organization
1st Cavalry Brigade
12th Regiment of Dragoons
12th Uhlan Regiment
2nd Cavalry Brigade
12th Regiment of Hussars
12th Regiment of Cossacks
12th Horse Artillery Division

Commanders
1878–1886: Victor Fedorovitch Winberg
1886–1896: Alexander Mikhailovich Lermontov
1896–1898: David Ivanovich Orlov
1898–1899: Sergei Vasilchikov
1912-1915: Alexey Kaledin
1915-1917: Carl Gustaf Emil Mannerheim

References

Cavalry divisions of the Russian Empire
Military units and formations disestablished in 1918